The Argentine Fascist Party (Partido Fascista Argentino, PFA) was a fascist political party in Argentina from 1932 until its official disbandment in 1936, when it was succeeded by the National Fascist Union (Union Nacional Fascista, UNF). Founded by Italian Argentines, the party was formed as a breakaway faction from Argentina's National Fascist Party (Partido Nacional Fascista, PNF). It was based upon Italian Fascism and was recognized by Benito Mussolini's Italian National Fascist Party in 1935. In the 1930s the party became a mass organization, particularly in Córdoba. Nicholás Vitelli led the PFA's branch in Córdoba until his death in 1934, whereafter Nimio de Anquín took the leadership of the party. The PFA's main political allies in Córdoba were the Argentine Civic Legion and the Nationalist Action of Argentina/Affirmation of a New Argentina movement.

References

Fascism in Argentina
Fascist parties
Defunct political parties in Argentina
Political parties established in 1932
1932 establishments in Argentina
Political parties disestablished in 1936
1936 disestablishments in Argentina